You Had My Heart is the third studio album by Finnish singer-songwriter Saara Aalto. It was released on 24 May 2013 by Yume Records. It peaked at number 43 on the Finnish Albums Chart. The album was produced by Teemu Roivainen.

Singles
"You Had My Heart" was released as the lead single from the album on 22 March 2013. The music video for the song was uploaded to YouTube on 23 March 2013 at a total length of four minutes and twenty-eight seconds, the video was directed by Marko Mäkilaakso.

Track listing

Charts

Weekly charts

Release history

References

2013 albums
Saara Aalto albums